Habenaria macraithii, commonly known as the whiskered rein orchid, is a species of orchid that is endemic to a small area in far north Queensland. It has up to eleven scattered leaves and up to twenty five relatively large green flowers with thread-like petal lobes.

Description 
The petals have two lobes. The labellum has three lobes. Flowering occurs from July to September.

Taxonomy and naming
Habenaria macraithii was first formally described in 1984 by Bill Lavarack and the description was published in The Orchadian. The specific epithet (macraithii) honours Gerald McCraith of the Australian Orchid Foundation. In Australia, the species is formally known as Habenaria maccraithii.

Distribution and habitat
The whiskered rein orchid grows on levees in rainforest. It is only known from a few sites in the Kutini-Payamu and Kulla National Parks.

Conservation
Habenaria macraithii is listed as "endangered"  under the Australian Government EPBC Act.

References

Orchids of Queensland
Endemic orchids of Australia
Plants described in 1984
macraithii